= International Archives of Occupational and Environmental Health =

- Discipline: Environmental health
- Language: English
- Edited by: Edwin van Wijngaarden

Publication details
- Former name(s): Internationales Archiv für Arbeitsmedizin, Internationales Archiv für Gewerbepathologie und Gewerbehygiene, Archiv für Gewerbepathologie und Gewerbehygiene
- History: 1930-present
- Publisher: Springer Science+Business Media
- Frequency: 10/year
- Impact factor: 2.851 (2021)

Standard abbreviations
- ISO 4: Int. Arch. Occup. Environ. Health

Indexing
- CODEN: IAEHDW
- ISSN: 0340-0131 (print); 1432-1246 (web)
- LCCN: 76642762
- OCLC no.: 657616541

Links
- Journal homepage; Online archive

The International Archives of Occupational and Environmental Health is a peer-reviewed medical journal covering occupational and environmental health. It was established in 1930 under the name Archiv für Gewerbepathologie und Gewerbehygiene; its name was changed to Internationales Archiv für Gewerbepathologie und Gewerbehygiene beginning in 1962. In 1970, the journal's name was again changed, this time to Internationales Archiv für Arbeitsmedizin. The journal obtained its current name in 1975. It is published ten times per year by Springer Science+Business Media and the editor-in-chief is Edwin van Wijngaarden (University of Rochester). The journal has a 2021 impact factor of 2.851.
